Carlsbro is a UK-based supplier of musical instrument amplification and speaker systems that was founded by Stuart and Sheila Mercer in Nottingham, England in 1960. Their equipment has been used by artists such as The Beatles, Mick Jagger, Oasis, The Bubblecars and Vašek Martínek.

The company entered administration in 2009, but has since been relaunched.

References

External links
 Company website

Audio amplifier manufacturers
Companies based in Milton Keynes
Audio equipment manufacturers of the United Kingdom
Guitar amplifier manufacturers
Manufacturing companies based in Nottingham